Moose Hunters is a 1937 American animated short film produced by Walt Disney Productions and released by United Artists. It was the 93rd short in the Mickey Mouse film series, and the fourth for that year. The cartoon stars Mickey Mouse, Donald Duck, and Goofy on a moose hunting expedition. It was directed by Ben Sharpsteen and features music by Paul J. Smith. The voice cast includes Walt Disney as Mickey, Clarence Nash as Donald, and Pinto Colvig as Goofy.

This cartoon was released on the same year as Snow White and the Seven Dwarfs (1937).

Plot
The short begins with a female moose (with blond curly hair and antlers oddly enough) wading through a lake. Other odd things that make this moose strange is that she sounds her mating call with a horn and her legs are strangely familiar. The legs' owners are Donald and Goofy, disguised in a moose costume. Following them is Mickey, sounding his own moose call while being disguised as a shrub on stilts. Goofy's call is answered by an actual moose, causing him and Donald to excitedly shout "A moose!". Mickey tells them to "do their stuff" so he can shoot the moose with his shotgun. So, the duo go off to track down a moose.

We go back to Mickey, who is searching for a moose. He stands over a bush and sounds his call, which is answered by a large red bull moose who was hiding in the bush. This understandably freaks Mickey out, who drops his shotgun, which fires and breaks, briefly scaring the moose. The antlered beast, now hungry decides to eat Mickey's disguise and takes a bite. The mouse, not wanting to risk being caught, takes a few steps back, but the bull follows and takes another bite, this time taking Mickey's shorts along with a mouthful of leaves. Of course, the mouse takes his shorts back.

Meanwhile, Donald and Goofy have tracked down their quarry, a large black bull moose. Watching the male eat a bush full of leaves in one bite causes an jubilant Donald to add some makeup and lipstick to make the costume more attractive. Goofy adds in some "deer kiss" perfume to the disguise and himself and sprays a trail towards the bull, letting the wind do the rest. The moose, entranced by the scent follows it to the waiting "lady moose". A mere glance is all it takes for the rutting bull to become smitten, especially when "she" does a teasing walk for him.

When the costumed cow moose gives a "yoo-hoo", the bull moose gives a howling response, blowing off the costume. Goofy (who still has the moose head on) quickly comes up with a plan and fan dances until he and Donald can get the costume back on, which makes the lovestruck male even more smitten with the costume. Once again disguised, the pair seductively dance with the aroused bull, succeeding in getting him to follow them; unfortunately, the Donald half falls off a cliff and lands on an angry bee. The insect follows the duck into the costume, making the pair dance to the tune of "La Cucuracha". The moose, angling for a kiss, kisses Goofy on the face, as Donald tries to hit the bee, causing the moose head to fly off of Goofy, luckily landing on him just before they could be caught. They lure the ecstatic moose to Mickey so he can do the rest. However, they don't know their leading the moose right towards another.

Unfortunately for the mouse, his cover has been eaten off and the moose he has been dealing with is not pleased. As the moose prepares to charge at Mickey, he hears a flirty "yoo-hoo", which catches his attention. Turning around, the rutting moose sees an attractive cow moose trotting towards him. Smitten with the "female", the aroused bull trots over to the costumed moose as "she" unknowingly backs up into him. While the horny male licks the costume's face and cozies up to "her"(despite a disguised Goofy trying to smack the antlered beast off of him), Donald tries to move the costume... only to realise he's under the moose trying to woo the "hot blonde". Before the red moose tries any more moves with what appears to be an attractive cow moose under him, the jealous black moose challenges him for the "lady moose's" hand, which he angrily responds to in kind.

The two bulls prepare to fight as Donald and Goofy run up a tree. The moose sharpen their antlers, clash and the earthshaking body slams cause Goofy and Donald, hanging on to the tree for dear life, fall between the two bulls. The antlered beasts forget about the whole costume incident, and Donald and Goofy run for their lives while the angry moose chase them. Mickey soon joins them as they run for their lives, going on a boat and racing away, concluding the cartoon.

Voice cast
 Mickey Mouse: Walt Disney
 Donald Duck: Clarence Nash
 Goofy: Pinto Colvig

Home media
The short was released on December 4, 2001 on Walt Disney Treasures: Mickey Mouse in Living Color.

In other media
Moose Hunters served as the basis, as well as title, for the third stage in the video game, Mickey Mania, which was released for the Super NES, Genesis, Sega CD and PlayStation (under the title Mickey's Wild Adventure).

See also
Mickey Mouse (film series)

References

1937 animated films
1937 films
1930s color films
1930s Disney animated short films
Mickey Mouse short films
Hunting in popular culture
Films about hunters
Films directed by Ben Sharpsteen
Films produced by Walt Disney
1930s American films